Elachista heteroplaca is a moth in the family Elachistidae. It was described by Edward Meyrick in 1934. It is found in India.

References

Moths described in 1934
heteroplaca
Moths of Asia